Diana Consuelo Turbay Quintero (March 9, 1950 – January 25, 1991) was a Colombian journalist kidnapped by the Medellín Cartel and killed by the Colombian Guerrilla during a botched rescue attempt. Her story has been portrayed in a non-fiction book by Gabriel García Márquez and onscreen.

Early years
Diana Turbay was born on March 9, 1951, in Bogotá to Julio César Turbay Ayala, who would later be the 25th president of the Republic of Colombia (1978–1982) and Nydia Quintero Turbay. Her father was her mother's maternal uncle. The Turbay family were originally from Lebanon and her family still belong to, and frequent, the Club Colombo Libanes, a private social club of prominent Lebanese-Colombians.

Kidnapping and death
Turbay was kidnapped on August 30, 1990, when she was tricked into going to a supposed interview with a guerrilla leader, the Spanish priest Manuel Pérez Martínez, alias El Cura Pérez (The Priest Pérez). Turbay had been contacted by phone by an unidentified man. Later, a police investigation determined that the man belonged to Los Priscos, a criminal band, and had been hired by Pablo Escobar. The latter's aim was to kidnap as many politicians and journalists as possible, to prevent Colombian legislators from approving an extradition treaty with the United States. Additional victims of this strategy were Francisco Santos Calderón, Maruja Pachón, and Marina Montoya.

Turbay was kept at Copacabana, Antioquia, with her cameraman Richard Becerra. She died on January 25, 1991, during a botched rescue operation launched by the police without authorization from the family. The cause of death was a bullet in her back, which partially destroyed her liver and left kidney.

Family
Turbay was survived by her two children, María Carolina Hoyos Turbay (born 1972) and Miguel Uribe Turbay (born 1986), and her husband, Miguel Uribe Londoño.

In popular culture

Literature
The story of Turbay's abduction is recounted in Gabriel Garcia Márquez's non-fiction book, News of a Kidnapping (1996).

Television
Turbay is portrayed by the actress Liesel Potdevin in the TV series Pablo Escobar: El Patrón del Mal (2012).

Turbay is portrayed by Gabriela de la Garza in the Netflix Original Series Narcos (2015).

Turbay is portrayed by Majida Issa in the Amazon Prime Videoseries “Noticia de un Secuestro’’ (2022).

See also
List of kidnappings
List of solved missing person cases

References

1950 births
1991 deaths
20th-century women writers
20th-century Colombian writers
Assassinated Colombian journalists
Children of presidents of Colombia
Colombian people taken hostage
Colombian people of Lebanese descent
Colombian women journalists
Deaths by firearm in Colombia
Missing person cases in Colombia
People from Bogotá
People murdered in Colombia
People murdered by Colombian organized crime
Diana